The women's slalom competition of the Beijing 2022 Olympics was held on 9 February, " on Ice River" course at the Yanqing National Alpine Ski Centre in Yanqing District. Petra Vlhová of Slovakia won the event. This was the first Olympic medal for Vlhová and the first Olympic medal in alpine skiing for Slovakia. Katharina Liensberger of Austria won silver, her first individual Olympic medal, and Wendy Holdener of Switzerland bronze.

Frida Hansdotter, the 2018 champion, retired from competitions. The silver medalist, Holdener, and the bronze medalist, Katharina Gallhuber, qualified for the Olympics. At the 2021–22 FIS Alpine Ski World Cup, seven slalom events were held before the Olympics. Petra Vlhová was leading the ranking, followed by Mikaela Shiffrin, Holdener, and Lena Dürr. Katharina Liensberger is the 2021 world champion, with Vlhová and Shiffrin being the silver and bronze medalists, respectively.

Qualification

Results
Results were as follows:

References

Women's alpine skiing at the 2022 Winter Olympics